Bahen (Hindi बहन, Sister) is a 1941 Hindi film directed by Mehboob Khan. Sagar Movietone had closed down during the start of WW II and reformed as National Studios. It was under the new banner that Mehboob Khan produced his three important films of that time, Aurat (1940), Bahen (1941) and Roti (1942). Written by Babubhai Mehta and Zia Sarhadi, it had dialogues and screenplay by Wajahat Mirza. The cinematography was by Faredoon Irani. Anil Biswas was the music director with lyrics by  Safdar Aah. The cast included Sheikh Mukhtar, Nalini Jaywant, Harish, Kanhaiyalal, Husn Bano, Swaroop Rani, Baby Meena (Meena Kumari) and Bhudo Advani.

It was the first film of Nalini Jaywant; she played the younger sister to Sheikh Mukhtar, who takes her responsibility after their parents perish in an earthquake. He lives for her and does everything required to keep her safe and happy even to the extent of moving and changing his job many times. So much so that he doesn't realize that she has grown up and needs to live her own life. The film brought Jaywant into prominence.

Plot
Having saved his little sister Bina (Baby Meena Kumari) from the floods, Amar (Sheikh Mukhtar) becomes increasingly possessive about her over the years. Amar falls in love twice but forgoes marriage so he can look after the growing Bina. Bina (Nalini Jaywant), now a grown up young girl falls in love with the social activist Rajendra (Harish). However, Amar can not bear to lose Bina and so he plans her marriage to the thief Moti Kanhaiyalal, with the idea that he'll get her divorced after some time and then Bina would stay with him always. After several incidents that end up uniting Rajendra and Bina, Amar gets some happiness when a daughter is born to Bina.

Cast
Sheikh Mukhtar as Amar
Nalini Jaywant as Bina
Harish as Rajendra
Dulari (actress) nurse in hospital 
Kanhaiyalal as Moti
Husn Bano
Swaroop Rani
Shahzadi
R. Choube
Baby Meena (Meena Kumari) as the child Bina
Bhudo Advani
Agashe
Iqbal Begum
Beena Kumari

Music
Song list

References

External links

 Full movie on Dailymotion
 Bahen (1941) on YouTube

1941 films
1940s Hindi-language films
Films directed by Mehboob Khan
Indian black-and-white films